Frank Alexander Hettinga (born 26 November 1971, in Sneek) is a sailor from the Netherlands, who represented his country at the 1996 Summer Olympics in Savannah. Hettinga as crew in the Dutch Soling with Willem Potma as helmsman and Gerhard Potma as fellow crew Hettinga took 1st place.

Professional life
 Owner: Easysup Supstore (2013 – Present)
 Owner: Hettinga Jacht Service (2007 – Present)
 Director: Hettinga Jacht-Service (2007 – Present)
 Director and owner:  (1998–2007)
 Project manager: Royal Deck (2008–2011)
 Production coordinator: de Vries Makkum (2010–2013)

Further reading

1996 Olympics (Savannah)

References

Living people
1971 births
People from Sneek
Sportspeople from Friesland
Dutch male sailors (sport)
Sailors at the 1996 Summer Olympics – Soling
Olympic sailors of the Netherlands
20th-century Dutch people